Norham and Islandshires was a rural district in Northumberland, England from 1894 to 1974.

The district was formed under the Local Government Act 1894 from the Berwick rural sanitary district.  It contained all the historic area of Norhamshire and most of Islandshire, including Norham and Lindisfarne (Holy Island), which had been under the jurisdiction of the County Palatine of Durham until 1844.

The district survived until 1974, when it was abolished under the Local Government Act 1972.  It then formed part of the Borough of Berwick-upon-Tweed.

References

History of Northumberland
Local government in Northumberland
Districts of England abolished by the Local Government Act 1972
Districts of England created by the Local Government Act 1894
Rural districts of England